Carol Matas is a Canadian writer.

Carol Matas has had more than forty-five books for young people published over several decades, including science fiction, fantasy, historical and contemporary. Her novels often reflect a Jewish perspective, and her best-known are set during the Holocaust. Her books have been highly honored. She has been shortlisted for the Governor General's Awards twice.

Bibliography 
 After the War
 Cloning Miranda (1999)
 The Second Clone (2001)
 The Dark Clone (2005)
 Of Two Minds (with Perry Nodelman)
 More Minds (with Perry Nodelman)
 Out of their Minds (with Perry Nodelman)
 A Meeting of Minds (with Perry Nodelman)
 The Freak
 The Garden
 Jesper
 Kris's War (formerly Code Name Kris)
 Lisa's War
 Past Crimes (2007)
 Sparks Fly Upward
 Visions
 The War Within
 Daniel's Story
 The Primrose Path
 Footsteps in the Snow: The Red River Diary of Isobel Scott (part of Dear Canada series)
 Turned Away: The World War II Diary of Devorah Bernstein (part of Dear Canada series)
 A Season for Miracles: Twelve Tales of Christmas (contributor, part of Dear Canada series)
 Pieces of the Past: The Holocaust Diary of Rose Rabinowitz (part of Dear Canada series)
 A Time for Giving: Ten Tales of Christmas (contributor, part of Dear Canada series)
 Behind Enemy Lines: World War II, Sam Frederiksen (part of I Am Canada series)
 Greater Than Angels
 The Lost Locket
 In my Enemy's House
Past Crimes (Fictive Press, 2020)
Cloning Miranda (Fictive Press, 2017)
Tucson Jo (Fictive Press, 2014), National Jewish Book Awards Finalist
When I Die: A meditation on death for children & their families (Fictive Press, 2013)
A Struggle for Hope (Scholastic Canada, 2021)

References

External links

Carol Matas' official website

Living people
Canadian children's writers
Jewish Canadian writers
Canadian women children's writers
Canadian women novelists
Jewish women writers
Year of birth missing (living people)